Gregory Maxdier Vargas Díaz (born 18 February 1986) is a Venezuelan professional basketball player who last played for Hapoel Haifa of the Israeli Basketball Premier League. He was the Israeli Basketball Premier League Defensive Player of the Year in 2016 and 2017, and the Israeli Premier League Assists Leader in 2017 and 2020.

Professional career 
In the 2015–16 season, Vargas averaged 13.9 points and 6.4 assists per game in the Israeli Premier League, with Maccabi Haifa.

Vargas also played against the NBA's Memphis Grizzlies as a part of Maccabi Haifa, in an NBA preseason game. He scored over 20 points in 8 games, and had 10 or more assists in 3 games as well, during the 2015–16 season.

On 7 July 2016, Vargas signed with French club SLUC Nancy. In November 2016, he left Nancy after appearing in eight games.

On 17 December 2016, he returned to his former club Maccabi Haifa., During his season with the club he won Israeli Super League Defensive Player of the Year award and helped Haifa reaching the Israeli League Finals. He was the Israeli Basketball Premier League Defensive Player of the Year in 2016 and 2017. He was also the Israeli Premier League Assists Leader in 2017.

On 20 July 2017, Vargas signed with the Spanish club Baloncesto Fuenlabrada of the Liga ACB for the 2017–18 season.

On 1 August 2019, Vargas returned to Maccabi Haifa for a third stint, signing a one-year deal. On 3 February 2020, Vargas recorded a triple-double 16 points, 12 rebounds and 13 assists, leading Haifa to a 93–84 win over Hapoel Gilboa Galil. He was subsequently named Israeli League Round 18 MVP. He was the Israeli Premier  League Assists Leader in 2019–20.

On 2 July 2020, he signed with Cluj of the Romanian Liga Națională.

Vargas played with Cocodrilos de Caracas in the 2021 season of the Venezuelan SuperLiga and was named the league MVP after averaging 17.4 points and 7.7 assists for the team.

National team career 
Vargas is a member of the senior men's Venezuelan national basketball team.  As a member of the team at the 2015 FIBA Americas Championship, he helped Venezuela to defeat Uruguay and Canada to win the gold medal. That was Venezuela's first FIBA Americas Championship, and allowed them to qualify for the 2016 Summer Olympics in Rio, where Vargas also played with Venezuela.

Player profile 
Vargas was described as a tough FIBA player, who could be a college basketball All-American, by ESPN basketball analyst Fran Fraschilla.

Personal 
Vargas' older brother José is also a professional basketball player. The two brothers have played together on the senior men's Venezuelan national team.

References

External links 
FIBA Profile
Eurobasket.com Profile

1986 births
Living people
2019 FIBA Basketball World Cup players
Baloncesto Fuenlabrada players
Baloncesto Superior Nacional players
Basketball players at the 2015 Pan American Games
Basketball players at the 2016 Summer Olympics
Basketball players at the 2019 Pan American Games
Cocodrilos de Caracas players
Guaros de Lara (basketball) players
Halcones de Xalapa players
Halcones Rojos Veracruz players
Hapoel Haifa B.C. players
Israeli Basketball Premier League players
Liga ACB players
Maccabi Haifa B.C. players
Maratonistas de Coamo players
Marinos B.B.C. players
Olympic basketball players of Venezuela
Pan American Games competitors for Venezuela
Panteras de Miranda players
People from Ocumare del Tuy
Point guards
Shooting guards
SLUC Nancy Basket players
Venezuelan expatriate basketball people in France
Venezuelan expatriate basketball people in Israel
Venezuelan expatriate basketball people in Mexico
Venezuelan expatriate basketball people in Puerto Rico
Venezuelan expatriate basketball people in Spain
Venezuelan men's basketball players